Senate elections were held in the Czech Republic on 20 and 21 October 2006, with a second round on 27 and 28 October. The result was a victory for the Civic Democratic Party, which won 41 of the 81 seats. Voter turnout was 41% in the first round and just 21% in the second.

Results

References

Czech
Senate
Senate elections in the Czech Republic
Czech